Petra Országhová (born 7 April 1981 in Banská Bystrica, Czechoslovakia) is a Slovakian ice hockey defender.

International career
Országhová was selected for the Slovakia national women's ice hockey team in the 2010 Winter Olympics. She averaged over twenty minutes of ice time in the five games, but did not record a point. She played in the 2010 Olympic qualifying campaign.

Országhová also appeared for Slovakia at five IIHF Women's World Championships, across three levels. Her first appearance came in 2007. She appeared at the top level championships in  2011 and 2012.

Career statistics

International career

References

External links
Eurohockey.com Profile
Sports-Reference Profile

1981 births
Living people
Ice hockey players at the 2010 Winter Olympics
Olympic ice hockey players of Slovakia
Sportspeople from Banská Bystrica
Slovak women's ice hockey defencemen